Pennsylvania Route 890 (PA 890) is an  state highway located in Northumberland County, Pennsylvania.  The southern terminus is at PA 225 in Zerbe Township.  The northern terminus is at PA 61 in Upper Augusta Township. The route runs through rural areas as a two-lane road, passing through the community of Augustaville. PA 890 was designated in 1928 between Augustaville and U.S. Route 120 (US 120, now PA 61) near Sunbury. The route was extended to PA 225 in Trevorton in 1941.

Route description

PA 890 begins at an intersection with PA 225 in the community of Trevorton in Zerbe Township, running north on two-lane undivided North 5th Street past homes. Leaving Trevorton, the route becomes an unnamed road and heads west across forested Little Mountain. While crossing the mountain, the road briefly enters Shamokin Township before heading into Rockefeller Township. After crossing the mountain, PA 890 enters a mix of farmland and woodland with a few scattered residences, turning to the north. The road passes through Augustaville and continues through more agricultural surroundings with scattered woods and homes. PA 890 heads northwest through more rural areas before entering Upper Augusta Township and reaching its northern terminus at PA 61 in the residential community of Hamilton.

History

When Pennsylvania first legislated routes in 1911, what is now PA 890 was not given a number. PA 890 was designated in 1928 to run from Augustaville north to US 120 (now PA 61) east of Sunbury along an unpaved road. By 1930, a small portion of the route south of the US 120 intersection was paved. The entire length of the road was paved in the 1930s. On March 1, 1941, PA 890 was extended south from Augustaville to PA 225 in Trevorton.

Major intersections

See also

References

External links

Pennsylvania Highways: PA 890

890
Transportation in Northumberland County, Pennsylvania